Emre Aygün (born 1 June 1985) is a Turkish footballer who plays as a forward.

Career
Born in Trabzon, Aygün started playing youth football for Trabzonspor and promoted to the professional team in January 2003. He would make only five league appearances for the club, and had loan spells with Yimpaş Yozgatspor and Akçaabat Sebatspor.

In January 2006, Aygün left Trabzonspor, and would spend the next few seasons playing in the second and third level of Turkish football. He joined MKE Ankaragücü for the 2009–10 Super Lig season, and scored three goals in ten league matches.

References

External links
Guardian's Stats Centre

1985 births
Living people
Turkish footballers
Trabzonspor footballers
Yimpaş Yozgatspor footballers
Akçaabat Sebatspor footballers
Orduspor footballers
MKE Ankaragücü footballers
Eskişehirspor footballers
Göztepe S.K. footballers
Bandırmaspor footballers
Turkey youth international footballers
Süper Lig players
TFF First League players
TFF Second League players
Association football forwards